William Willis Wood may refer to:
 William W. Wood, engineer of the United States Navy
 William Willis Wood (mayor), English mill owner, Wesleyan Methodist preacher and mayor of Bradford, Yorkshire